Klingalese (Malay: Orang Keling, Dutch: Klingalezen, Kodja's, English: Klingalese) referred to an ethnic group in at least Dutch East Indies (Indonesia), Straits Settlements and British India, originating from the Coromandel Coast, Kalinga and the Malabar region. They were predominantly Shiite muslims and traders. At least at the beginning of the 20th century there was a Klingalese quarter in Padang. In British India Klingalese was also used to designate a specific ethnic group, witness antiquarian photography captions, shown here. Klingalezen was also used in the Dutch East Indies (Indonesia) in a broader sense including other Asian minorities as well.

Gallery

See also
 Indian Indonesians

Sources

Ethnic groups in Indonesia
Ethnic groups in India